Castles in the Air, also known by its working title Orchestra D-2, is a 1919 American silent comedy film, directed by George D. Baker. It stars May Allison, Ben Wilson, and Clarence Burton, and was released on May 12, 1919.

Cast list
 May Allison as Fortuna Donnelly
 Ben Wilson as Eddie Lintner
 Clarence Burton as John McArthur
 Walter I. Percival as the Honorable Owen Pauncefort
 Irene Rich as Mrs. Owen Pauncefort
 Mother Anderson as Mrs. Larrymore
 Viola Dolan as Esther Jones
 Ruth Maurice as Lucy Dalton

Plot
Fortuna Donnelly is an usherette in the Halcyon theater, where the theater's manager, Eddie Lintner is smitten with her.  However, she is also pursued by Owen Pauncefort, a wealthy Englishman.  She chooses to focus her attention on Pauncefort.  After he wines and dines her, and makes sexual advances towards her, she finds out that he is married and estranged from his wife.  When confronted, he apologizes and says that he has been searching for his wife. Fortuna returns to the theater where she orchestrates Pauncefort being seated next to his wife during a show, reuniting the two.  Lintner continues his pursuit of Fortuna, and the two end up together.

Reception
Exhibitors Herald gave the film a lukewarm review, saying that it had a "tendency to drag" and a "pronounced familiarity plot outline", but it did "hold the interest until the finish".  Variety, on the other hand, gave the film a positive review, calling the plot "a novelty", and saying that the film "holds the interest from the beginning".

References

External links 
 
 
 

Films directed by George D. Baker
Metro Pictures films
American silent feature films
American black-and-white films
Silent American comedy films
Films based on short fiction
1919 comedy films
1919 films
1910s English-language films
1910s American films